Yves Rüedi (born 30 September 1976) is a Judge of the Federal Supreme Court of Switzerland.

Professional career

Education 
Rüedi earned a Master of Laws degree in 2002 and a Doctor of Law degree in 2009 from the University of St. Gallen.

National career 
From 2002 until 2012, Rüedi worked in private legal practice with Pestalozzi Attorneys at Law in Zurich. In 2006 he was elected President of the High Court of the Canton of Glarus by the Landsgemeinde. In 2013 the Federal Assembly appointed him as a judge to the Federal Supreme Court of Switzerland. Rüedi was the youngest judge elected to the Federal Supreme Court in recent history. The Judicial Committee of the Federal Assembly accredited him with an impressive academic career.

International career 
From 2018 to 2020, Yves Rüedi was a member of the International Council of Arbitration for Sport (ICAS), which is the governing body of the Court of Arbitration for Sport.
In 2020, Yves Rüedi was appointed to the Enlarged Board of Appeal of the European Patent Office.

Private life 
Rüedi is passionate about sports in general and regularly works out. In 2001 he qualified for the Ironman World Championship in Hawaii. He repeated this exploit in 2017. His performance positioned him in the top 1% of his age group earning him 2018 Ironman Gold All World Athlete status.

References

External links 
 Yves Rüedi on the official website of the Federal Supreme Court of Switzerland

21st-century Swiss judges
1976 births
Living people
University of St. Gallen alumni